The Windy Hill is a children's novel by Cornelia Meigs. A brother and sister learn about their own family's history in New England through a series of tales told by the Beeman. The novel, illustrated by Berta and Elmer Hader, was first published in 1921 and was a Newbery Honor recipient in 1922.

A public domain online edition of The Windy Hill is available at A Celebration of Women Writers.

References

External links
 
 
 Online edition of The Windy Hill

1921 American novels
American children's novels
Newbery Honor-winning works
1921 children's books